Joe Wardill (born 26 November 1997) is an English former professional rugby league footballer who last played as a er and  for the Dewsbury Rams in the Betfred Championship.

Wardill is currently assistant coach of the Hull Kingston Rovers' Women's Team.

Background
Wardill was born in Beverley, East Riding of Yorkshire, England. Wardill is a former pupil of Beverley Grammar School. Wardill is a product of the Hull Kingston Rovers' Academy System.

Playing career

Hull Kingston Rovers (2016-19) 
He made his début for Hull Kingston Rovers in the 2016 Super League season, against Wigan at the DW Stadium. On his home début at Craven Park in 2016, Wardill scored a try in the shock 22–36 defeat to the Oldham in the Challenge Cup. But despite the loss, he claimed the 'Man-of-the-Match' Award. Wardill suffered relegation from the Super League with Hull Kingston Rovers in the 2016 season, due to losing the Million Pound Game at the hands of Salford. 12-months later however, Wardill was part of the Hull Kingston Rovers side that won promotion back to the Super League, at the first time of asking following relegation the season prior. On 3 May 2018, it was revealed that Wardill had signed a new three-year contract extension with Hull Kingston Rovers, to keep him at Craven Park until the end of the 2021 season. It was revealed on 23 April 2019, that Wardill had decided to retire from professional rugby league following three hip operations in as many years. Wardill was just 21-years-old when he was forced to retire through persistent injury.

Dewsbury Rams
On 21 September 2020 it was reported that Wardill had come out of retirement to sign for Dewsbury
On 25 March 2021 it was reported that Wardill had been forced to retire for a second time due to injury

Coaching career

Hull Kingston Rovers' Women's Team

Assistant Coach (2019 - present)
Wardill, following his retirement from professional rugby league on 23 April 2019, Joe was subsequently appointed as assistant coach to Hull Kingston Rovers' newly formed Women's Team.

Honours

Career Awards and Accolades

Club (Hull Kingston Rovers 2016-19)
 2018: 'Community Clubman Award'

References

External links
Hull KR profile
SL profile

1997 births
Living people
Dewsbury Rams players
Hull Kingston Rovers players
Rugby league wingers
Rugby league centres